The West Indies cricket team toured India from November 1958 to February 1959 and played a five-match Test series against the India national cricket team. The West Indies won the series 3–0. The West Indies were captained by Gerry Alexander while India used four different captains in the series, Ghulam Ahmed leading in two Tests.

Touring party 
The West Indies Cricket Board announced a 16-man squad for the India tour on 1 April 1958 led by Frank Worrell. However, Worrell withdrew from the tour in May. John Holt and Wes Hall were added to the squad in August.

The squad included:
 Gerry Alexander (c)
 Eric Atkinson
 Basil Butcher
 Robin Bynoe
 Lance Gibbs
 Roy Gilchrist
 Wes Hall
 Jackie Hendriks (wk)
 John Holt
 Conrad Hunte
 Rohan Kanhai
 Sonny Ramadhin
 Willie Rodriguez
 Collie Smith
 Garfield Sobers
 Joe Solomon
 Jaswick Taylor

Test series summary

First Test

Second Test

Third Test

Fourth Test

Fifth Test

References

External links
 Tour home at ESPNcricinfo
 Tour home at ESPNcricinfo archive
 

1958 in Indian cricket
1958 in West Indian cricket
1959 in Indian cricket
1959 in West Indian cricket
Indian cricket seasons from 1945–46 to 1969–70
International cricket competitions from 1945–46 to 1960
1958